Jesus Lizard may refer to:

Jesus lizard (animal), or common basilisk, a species of lizard
The Jesus Lizard, an American rock band formed in 1987
The Jesus Lizard (EP), a 1998 EP by the band
"The Jesus Lizard", a 2006 song by Showbread from Age of Reptiles